Caripeta hilumaria is a species of geometrid moth in the family Geometridae.

The MONA or Hodges number for Caripeta hilumaria is 6871.

References

Further reading

 
 

Ourapterygini